Cuitlahuac Meza (born July 11, 1990) is an American soccer player who plays as a midfielder for Charlotte Eagles in the USL Pro.

Career

Professional
Meza signed with USL Pro club Charlotte Eagles in April 2012. He also appeared for MISL club Chicago Soul FC during their 2012-13 season.

References

1990 births
Living people
American soccer players
Bradley Braves men's soccer players
Ogden Outlaws players
Charlotte Eagles players
Chicago Soul FC players
Soccer players from Chicago
USL League Two players
USL Championship players
Major Indoor Soccer League (2008–2014) players
Association football midfielders